Luzerne is an unincorporated community in Oscoda County in the U.S. state of Michigan.  The community is located within Big Creek Township.  As an unincorporated community, Luzerne has no legally defined boundaries or population statistics of its own but does have its own post office with the 48636 ZIP Code.

Geography

The East Branch Big Creek, a tributary of the Au Sable River, flows through the community with a small impoundment known as Luzerne Pond along its route.  The Lost Creek Airport is located within the Luzerne area.

Luzerne uses its own post office with the 48636 ZIP Code, which covers most of the western portion of Big Creek Township, as well as smaller portions of Foster Township (Ogemaw County) to the south and South Branch Township (Crawford County) to the west.

History
Luzerne was first settled when Myran Hagaman and his family moved to the area from Luzerne, Pennsylvania in 1881.  A post office was established on November 4, 1881 under the name Luzerne, and Hagaman served as the first postmaster.  The post office has remained in operation and is currently located at 2289 Royce Avenue.  Luzerne also has its own volunteer fire department located at 2284 Deeter Road, as well as the Luzerne Cemetery used by the township.

Luzerne is served by Mio-Ausable Schools centered in the community of Mio just to the northeast.

Images

References

Unincorporated communities in Oscoda County, Michigan
Unincorporated communities in Michigan
Populated places established in 1881
1881 establishments in Michigan